Graham Douglas (February 5, 1879 – July 11, 1954) was an American sculptor. His work was part of the sculpture event in the art competition at the 1932 Summer Olympics.

References

1879 births
1954 deaths
20th-century American sculptors
American male sculptors
Olympic competitors in art competitions
People from Terre Haute, Indiana
20th-century American male artists